The 1987 German Formula Three Championship was a multi-event motor racing championship for single-seat open wheel formula racing cars held across Europe. The championship featured drivers competing in two-litre Formula Three racing cars which conformed to the technical regulations, or formula, for the championship. It commenced on 26 April at Nürburgring and ended at Zolder on 27 September after nine rounds.

Team Sonax Autopflege (Schübel Rennsport) driver Bernd Schneider dominated the championship. He won seven from eight races that he competed and clinched the title. Joachim Winkelhock lost 42 points to Schneider and finished as runner-up with win in the season finale at Zolder. Hanspeter Kaufmann won at AVUS. Víctor Rosso, Harald Huysman, Frank Biela, David Coyne, Tomi Luhtanen and Eric van de Poele were the other podium finishers.

Teams and drivers

Calendar

Results

Championship standings
Points are awarded as follows:

References

External links
 

German Formula Three Championship seasons
Formula Three season